Green money refers to:

 Money used for ecological purposes (ecocurrency). It is broadly used in the context of green economists, low carbon economy and political Greens.
Throughout the Middle East, Green money refers to money from Islamic businesses, Islamic banks, and the religious sector.
The European Union did at one time (and may still now) have green money for agricultural accounting.

The term should not be confused with the nickname "greenback" for the U.S. Dollar, which is printed with green ink.

See also 

Global warming
Green lending

Money